is a Japanese professional sumo wrestler from Yaizu, Shizuoka. He is a graduate of Kindai University. He debuted in sumo wrestling in September 2016 and made his makuuchi debut in January 2021. His highest rank has been maegashira 1. He wrestles for Isegahama stable.

Career
He began participating in sumo from elementary school, and was a member of the sumo club at junior high and at high school, competing in national competitions. He attended Kindai University, and was also a member of the sumo club there, but left during his second year, and eventually he returned to his hometown. It was during a visit there by the head coach of Isegahama stable, the former yokozuna Asahifuji, that he was persuaded to join professional sumo. He joined at the same time as his stablemate , and the two met in playoffs for the jonokuchi and jonidan division yusho or championships in their first two official tournaments in November 2016 and January 2017, with Midorifuji losing both. In January 2020 ranked at makushita 2 he earned promotion to the sekitori ranks for the first time with a 5-2 record. However, he still weighed barely  and turned in a losing 7-8 record in his jūryō division debut. He managed to remain in the division, and in September 2020 he produced an 11-4 record. In the following November 2020 tournament a 10-5 score was enough to earn him his first career championship (after a playoff win over Kyokushūhō), and also promotion to the top makuuchi division. 

Midorifuji was the fifth top division wrestler from Shizuoka Prefecture since World War II and the first since Sagatsukasa in 2010.
Ahead of his debut he said he hoped to emulate fellow small wrestlers Enhō and Terutsuyoshi. In his top division debut in January 2021 Midorifuji scored nine wins against six losses and won the ginosho or Technique prize, only the seventh wrestler to receive this award in his first makuuchi tournament and the first since Tochinohana in May 2000. Five of his nine wins were by the kimarite of katasukashi, or under-shoulder swing down. Midorifuji said he was happy to have received the award, but regretted that he had not managed ten wins. This performance saw him promoted to his highest rank to date of maegasahira 10 for the March 2021 tournament, where he produced a 5–10 record.  He withdrew from the May 2021 tournament due to a herniated disc in his back, requiring two months of treatment. Upon his comeback in July 2021, ranked in the jūryō division, he could only manage a 6-9 record. In March 2022 a 12–3 score saw him promoted back to the top division for the May tournament.

Fighting style
Midorifuji's Japan Sumo Association profile lists his favourite techniques as oshi (pushing) and katasukashi (under shoulder swing down). He has won 25 percent of his career matches to date with the latter technique, compared to an average among other wrestlers of just one percent. In November 2020 he beat Jōkōryū with the rare technique of zubuneri, or head pivot throw, which had not been seen at sekitori level in 22 years.

Career record

See also
Glossary of sumo terms
List of active sumo wrestlers
List of sumo tournament second division champions
Active special prize winners

References

External links

1996 births
Living people
Japanese sumo wrestlers
Sumo people from Shizuoka Prefecture
People from Yaizu, Shizuoka
Kindai University alumni